Shalkar is a brackish lake in Terekti  District, West Kazakhstan Region, Kazakhstan.

Shalkar lake is an important bird area.

Geography
Lake Shalkar lies at the bottom of a depression located in the northernmost sector of the Caspian Lowland. It is a brackish lake bound by salt marshes on the northern side.

The lake is fed by snow, as well as groundwater. It freezes in November and stays under ice until May. The main inflowing rivers are the Sholakankaty and Yesenankaty, having their mouths in the eastern shore. The outflowing Solyanka connects the lake basin with the Ural River basin and is mostly dry.

Flora and fauna 
Among the fish species found in the lake, bream, carp, tench, perch, pike, catfish and gudgeon deserve mention.
There are reed thickets on the Shalkar shores and in the areas of the river mouths. These provide a habitat for birds such as swans, geese, ducks, flamingos, seagulls and herons, among others.

See also
List of lakes of Kazakhstan

References

External links

Shalkar Lake - Kazakhstan rivers and lakes.
Tourism and recreational potential of the salt lakes of Western Kazakhstan

Lakes of Kazakhstan
West Kazakhstan Region
Ural basin
Important Bird Areas of Kazakhstan